Paulo Conrado do Carmo Sardin (born July 18, 1991), known as just Conrado, is a Brazilian footballer who plays as a forward for V.League 1 club Dong A Thanh Hoa.

Career
Conrado joined J3 League club AC Nagano Parceiro in 2016.

Honours

Individual
Thai League 2 Top Scorer: 2020–21

References

External links

1991 births
Living people
Brazilian footballers
Brazilian expatriate footballers
Expatriate footballers in Japan
Expatriate footballers in Thailand
J3 League players
AC Nagano Parceiro players
Paulo Conrado do Carmo Sardin
Paulo Conrado do Carmo Sardin
Paulo Conrado do Carmo Sardin
Paulo Conrado do Carmo Sardin
Paulo Conrado do Carmo Sardin
Association football forwards